John Wallace Kelly (7 December 1926 – 29 April 2002) was a New Zealand rugby union player. His preferred position was fullback, but he also appeared on the wing or at centre. He first played for the New Zealand national side, the All Blacks, in 1949, playing in the two test matches against the Touring Australian team. He was not selected to play for New Zealand again until the 1953–54 tour of the British Isles, France and North America on which he played in 14 of the 36 games, but he was unable to displace Bob Scott as the first-choice fullback for the test matches. In all, Kelly scored 86 points for the All Blacks in his 16 appearances.

Outside of rugby, Kelly was a fine field athlete at the junior level, winning the South Island junior shot put and discus titles in 1944, and finishing second in the same events at the national championships the following year. He was educated at Ashburton High School, and then studied at Canterbury University College from where he graduated with a Bachelor of Arts in 1948 and a Master of Arts with third-class honours in 1949. He went on to teachers' training college in Auckland and became a high school teacher and, eventually, headmaster of Takapuna Grammar School.

References

1926 births
2002 deaths
Rugby union players from Ashburton, New Zealand
People educated at Ashburton College
University of Canterbury alumni
New Zealand rugby union players
New Zealand international rugby union players
Canterbury rugby union players
Auckland rugby union players
Rugby union fullbacks
Rugby union wings
Rugby union centres
Heads of schools in New Zealand
New Zealand male discus throwers
New Zealand male shot putters